Meissl (German: Meißl) is a German surname which may refer to:

Arnd Meißl (born 1968), an Austrian politician
Elke Delugan-Meissl (born 1959), Austrian architect with Delugan Meissl Associated Architects
Emerich Meissl, mathematician known for co-development of the Reichert-Meissl-Wollny value